"What's It All About" is the second single from Run-D.M.C.'s fifth studio album, Back from Hell. It was released on September 14, 1990, through Profile Records and was produced by the three members of the group. The song would prove to be the most successful single from the critically panned album, peaking at number 24 on the Billboard Hot R&B Singles chart and number four on the Hot Rap Singles chart.

"What It's All About" uses a sample from the Stone Roses' "Fool's Gold" as a basis for the track.

Track listing

A-side
"What's It All About" – 4:48
"Sucker D.J.'s" – 0:50
"The Ave." – 4:00
"The Ave." (radio version) – 3:55

B-side
"What's It All About" (instrumental) – 5:46
"The Ave." (instrumental) – 4:44

1990 singles
1990 songs
Run-DMC songs
Songs written by Darryl McDaniels
Songs written by Joseph Simmons
Songs written by Jam Master Jay
Profile Records singles